Steven John Potts (born 7 May 1967) is an English football coach and former professional footballer who is the assistant coach of West Ham United under-23's.

As a player, he was a defender notably in the Premier League for West Ham United where he made 399 league appearances, scoring 1 goal over a seventeen-year spell at Upton Park. He retired in 2003 following a spell with non-league side Dagenham & Redbridge in what was the only season during his career that he did not play for West Ham. He also represented the England national team eleven times at youth level.

Following retirement, Potts has held a variety of coaching roles at the West Ham academy including head coach of the U16, U18 and U21 teams.

Career
Potts started his career at West Ham United as an apprentice in 1983, making his first appearance against Queens Park Rangers on 1 January 1985. Known as Pottsy, he played for West Ham United for the next seventeen years. Primarily a fullback, Potts developed into a 'utility' player, he spent large portions of his career playing at centre-half despite being undersized for such a position. He also on occasion featured in midfield.

Potts was West Ham United Club captain for a three years between 1993 and 1996, and was voted Hammer of The Year in 1993 and 1995, and runner up in both 1992 and 1994. During his career he amassed a total of 505 appearances for the club (good enough for ninth place in the club's all-time appearance charts), scoring only one goal, in a 7–1 win against Hull City in 1990. His last competitive appearance for the club was on 7 March 2001 against Chelsea, although he stayed on until 2002. In 1997 he was awarded a testimonial by West Ham. The game was played on 2 August 1997 and was a 2–0 win against QPR.

Potts transferred to Dagenham & Redbridge on 13 September 2002 and played there for a full season before retiring from football.
In August 2011 he was appointed as coach for the West Ham United under-16 team. Potts was promoted to manage the West Ham United under-18 team in December 2012, taking charge of a 1–0 victory over Tottenham Hotspur in his maiden game. In January 2015, Potts was named as West Ham United Under-21 team coach.

For the 2021–22 season, Potts was named assistant coach of the under-23 team.

Personal life
In August 2007, he completed The Knowledge and qualified to drive a Hackney carriage. In 2008, he ran the London Marathon in aid of the charity Children with Leukaemia, raising £24,052.99 in the process.

His sons, Daniel and Freddie, are professional footballers for Luton Town and West Ham United respectively.

Career statistics

Honours
West Ham
UEFA Intertoto Cup: 1999
 FL Second Division: promotion 1990–91,1992–93

References

External links

1967 births
Living people
Sportspeople from Hartford, Connecticut
English footballers
England youth international footballers
American soccer players
American emigrants to England
Premier League players
English Football League players
West Ham United F.C. players
Dagenham & Redbridge F.C. players
National League (English football) players
Soccer players from Connecticut
West Ham United F.C. non-playing staff
Association football defenders
Association football coaches